Pterostylis viriosa, commonly known as the Adelaide Hills banded greenhood, is a plant in the orchid family Orchidaceae and is endemic to South Australia. Flowering plants have up several green flowers with faint white stripes. The flowers have an insect-like labellum which is green with a dark green mound on its upper end. Non-flowering plants have a rosette of leaves on a stalk, but flowering plants lack the rosette, instead having several stem leaves.

Description
Pterostylis viriosa, is a terrestrial,  perennial, deciduous, herb with an underground tuber. Non-flowering plants have a rosette of leaves on a short stalk. The flowering spike lacks a rosett but has a small number of stem leaves. The dorsal sepal and petals are fused, forming a hood or "galea" over the column. The petals have a wide, transparent flange on their outer edges. The lateral sepals turn downwards and are joined for most of their length before tapering to triangular tips. The labellum is insect-like and hairy with a dark green mound on the "head" end and a dark green mid-line. Flowering occurs from late July to early September.

Taxonomy and naming
This greenhood was first formally described in 2006 by David Jones and given the name Bunochilus viriosus. The description was published in Australian Orchid Research from a specimen collected in the Belair National Park. In 2008 Robert Bates changed the name to Pterostylis viriosa. The specific epithet (viriosa) is a Latin word meaning "robust" or "strong", referring to the robust nature of this orchid and to its large flowers.

Distribution
The Adelaide Hills banded greenhood occurs in the Fleurieu (KAN02), Mount Lofty Ranges (FLB01), Central Flinders (FLB06) and Talia (EYB04) biogeographic regions of South Australia.

References

viriosa
Endemic orchids of Australia
Orchids of South Australia
Plants described in 2006